The 1989 New Zealand local government reform was the most significant reform of local government in New Zealand in over a century. Some 850 local bodies were amalgamated into 86 local authorities, made up of regional and territorial levels.

Background
The last major local government reform was carried out through the abolition of provincial government. With effect of 1 January 1877, local government was vested in elected borough and county councils. The Counties Bill of 1876 created 63 counties out of the rural parts of the former provinces. Over the years, many new bodies were set up. Some of these bodies were multi-purpose, whilst others (for example harbour boards) were single-purpose. The Local Government Act 1974 consolidated the previous law relating to local government that applied to territorial local authorities, regional and district council bodies. It enabled the establishment of regional councils, but these were not established until the 1989 reform.

History
The Labour Party had the reform of local government as one of its policies for the  but without much detail; the proposals were developed during the first term of the Fourth Labour Government following the party's win in 1984. Michael Bassett was Minister of Local Government and he appointed a Local Government Commission, which was chaired by Brian Elwood from 1 April 1985 to 1 November 1992. The government had given the commission a guarantee that their findings would be regarded as binding. The resulting local government reform was undertaken along the lines of neo-liberal economic theory, and was done in conjunction with the economic reform that have become known as Rogernomics. Some 850 entities were amalgamated into 86 local authorities, made up of regional and territorial levels. Of the 850 entities, 249 were municipalities; the remainder were harbour boards, catchment boards, and drainage boards. Brian Rudman, a journalist and editorial writer for The New Zealand Herald, called the reforms "revolutionary".

Results of the reform

Regional authorities
New Zealand was divided into 14 regions, of which 13 were regional authorities, and the remaining one, Gisborne, was a unitary authority. Unitary authorities in New Zealand are district (or city) authorities that also fulfil the function of a regional authority.

Territorial authorities
At a territorial level, district and city authorities were created. The area of a district may belong to more than one regional authority.

References

Territorial authorities of New Zealand
Local government reforms